"The Long Rain" is a science fiction  short story by American writer Ray Bradbury. This story was originally published in 1950 - under a different title indicative of its ending - in the magazine Planet Stories, and then in the collection The Illustrated Man. The story tells of four men who have crashed on Venus, where it is always raining.

The story was republished in several collections and was incorporated into a film also titled The Illustrated Man.

Plot summary
The story is set on Venus in a jungle, where a group of four men whose rocket has crashed are attempting to reach the safety of a Sun Dome.  Bradbury portrays Venus as having nearly eternal rains. The men depend on the Sun Domes, lit and warmed by a miniature sun and filled with provisions, to keep from going insane. There are over 120 of these domes, but the indigenous Venusians destroy them when they can. The men are led by a character who is only identified as "the lieutenant". One of the men is killed by a lightning strike when he tries to run; the others remark "he shouldn't have jumped up" during an electrical storm. The three remaining men make their way to a Sun Dome, but find that it has been destroyed by the natives and offers no shelter from the rain. One of the men becomes despondent and stops responding, instead staring up into the rain. He is shot by Simmons who defends his actions as a mercy killing, preventing the man from slowly drowning as his lungs fill up with rain. As Simmons and the lieutenant continue on to where they think the next Sun Dome should be, Simmons believes that he is also going to go insane before they reach safety, and so commits suicide. The lieutenant continues on, and finally reaches the Sun Dome where he is warm and safe, with dry clothing and hot chocolate. That said, by this point in the tale, the lieutenant may not be a reliable narrator. Given the story's original title ("Death-by-Rain"), and the fact that all the other characters die by succumbing to the rain's sanity-attacking events, it is highly possible that he is hallucinating.

Publishing history
The story was originally published in 1950 as "Death-by-Rain" in the magazine Planet Stories. It was one of the first group of stories selected to be part of the collection The Illustrated Man. It was later re-published in 1962 in R is for Rocket, again in 1980 in The Stories of Ray Bradbury, and in the 1990 omnibus The Golden Apples of the Sun. It was also included in Bradbury Stories: 100 of His Most Celebrated Tales (2005).

Reception
Rob Fletcher uses the opening paragraph, in which Bradbury describes the rain of Venus with phrases like: "It was a hard rain, a perpetual rain, a sweating and steaming rain; it was a mizzle, a downpour, a fountain, a whipping in the eyes, an undertow at the ankles; it was a rain to drown all rains and the memory of rains" to illustrate the fact that Bradbury turns the rain into an "ominous force" that "threatens [the character's] very survival".

"The Long Rain", as a story, is a "typical Bradbury space yarn". His presentation of Venus as being rain-soaked has been proven wrong by more modern science, but was in line with the scientific views of the time. The story was one in a large number of stories by many science fiction writers of the time that presented an "orthodoxy" that although it would be much more difficult than Mars, humans would fight to colonize Venus. While his description of Venus is not scientifically accurate, "Bradbury's power of description makes it real enough".

Adaptations
In 1969, Jack Smight directed a film adaptation of The Illustrated Man in which "The Long Rain" was one of three Bradbury stories placed within the framing story. The film, starring Rod Steiger who was an acquaintance of Bradbury, was both a critical and financial failure.

In 1992, the story was adapted for television, appearing as an episode in the series The Ray Bradbury Theater and starring Marc Singer, with Bradbury providing the introduction. Due to the discoveries of the true nature of Venus, since the story was originally published, all references to the planet being Venus, in this adaptation, were dropped. Instead the planet was said to be in another solar system.

References

External links
  

1950 short stories
Science fiction short stories
Short stories by Ray Bradbury
Short stories set on Venus
Works originally published in Planet Stories
Short stories adapted into films